El Hedi Belameiri (born April 24, 1991) is an Algerian footballer who plays for Algerian Ligue Professionnelle 1 club CA Bordj Bou Arréridj.

Club career
In July 2013, Belameiri turned down an offer from JS Kabylie and signed a two-year contract with ES Sétif.

References

External links
 
 

1991 births
Algerian footballers
Algerian Ligue Professionnelle 1 players
CSO Amnéville players
ES Sétif players
FC Metz players
Living people
Association football midfielders
21st-century Algerian people